Face to Face is a Philippine tabloid talk show aired on TV5 and hosted by Amy Perez. It is produced exclusively by TV5 Network Inc. and bills itself as a "Barangay hall on-air" (referring to the Tagalog term for a community centre).

The show aims to resolve minor conflicts between two arguing parties with the help of a panel of counselors that represent the legal, emotional and spiritual disciplines. It bears striking resemblance to the U.S. television show The Jerry Springer Show and the British talk show The Jeremy Kyle Show, but has a Filipino cultural perspective, predominantly with "marginalized and impoverished guests".

The show is one of the most popular talk shows in the Philippines and has often been labelled as the "Filipino version of Jerry Springer" but has also proved to be controversial due to the violence exhibited in the show. Hence, the Movie and Television Review and Classification Board has requested that the show "tone down physical altercations between guests".

Overview
The program aims to make a televised Barangay Hall, a small local government office where people take arguments to be heard by Tanods (Peacekeepers). It also aims to give its audience lessons by showing the complainant's problems that the hosts and the counselors try to solve.

Any citizen in the Philippines who can speak Tagalog can file any complaint about someone which will become the basis for an episode. The production crew then goes over the records available and choose which cases to present on the show. They will then interview the two parties and provide background about the problem.

During the show, the host, Amy Perez, will talk to the complainant in-person to describe the problem. This is the Puti or white side. The Sawsaweros (male studio audience involver) and the Sawsaweras (Vice-Versa), may ask some questions or make statements, along with the persons originally involved. After a live interview with the complainant, the opponent is brought on stage and forms the Pula, or red side.

Next there is a confrontation, which often results in an argument or even a fight on the stage. As the show progresses, both sides may add another person, to persuade the live audience. Before the guest go on the stage, they undergo security inspection for the safety of both arguing parties. At most key points in the show the host will ask the audience which side they are on, which is answered by the audience by raising signs with the colors for each side. The stage crew is always prepared for a fight and interdicted by two bouncers, designated B1 and B2 while a production crew and the security unit are the backup if more than two people are involved. In most cases the fight scenes are removed from the daytime version of the show, but left in the primetime edition, which is a 60-minute replay. The evening edition is always inspected by the MTRCB before it is broadcast. Paramedics are also available in case of serious injuries.

The Trio Tagapayo (Three Advisers) can also give tips and advice to prevent fights. This group is composed of a lawyer, a psychologist and a priest who give legal, psychological, spiritual advice to the two parties respectively. Occasionally the show invites a guest expert as appropriate to the conflict involved.

The show sometimes ends with statements from the involved parties that they are not yet ready to be friends again or resolve the problem. After giving the final resolution or not, the host pronounces her final thoughts (or Amy-nan) on the issue. The show also conducts a follow-up to confirm if there is progress or not.

Face to Face was developed into a new program, Face the People, which will premiere on October 14, 2013. Amy Perez was supposed to host the new show, along with Gelli de Belen. However, Perez, who resigned as host of Face to Face on July 19, 2013, declined to join the program. Tin-Tin Bersola-Babao was chosen to be co-host instead.

Hosts
 Amy Perez titled as Tyang Amy (March 22, 2010 – July 2012; April 11, 2013 – July 19, 2013)
 Gelli de Belen titled as Ateng Gelli (July 2012 – April 10, 2013)

Spin-offs

Untold Stories
Untold Stories is a weekly docu-drama anthology on TV5 and is a spin-off of Face to Face. The show features stories featured on Face to Face and ran from September 9, 2010, until September 29, 2012.

Critical responses
In reviewing the program STIR Editor in Chief Edgar O. Cruz said: "The back-of-the-mind thought is that joiners are acting since they are paid" and described portions as "not very believable" and "not realistic". He added "The show gains more credibility points by being more spontaneous." While some critics claim that the show is scripted, host Amy Perez, claims that it is not.

See also
 List of programs aired by TV5 (Philippine TV network)

References

External links
Official website archives on Archive.org

TV5 (Philippine TV network) original programming
2010 Philippine television series debuts
2013 Philippine television series endings
Philippine television talk shows
Filipino-language television shows